Colegio Sagrado Corazón de Jesús is a Chilean high school located in Quinta de Tilcoco, Cachapoal Province, Chile.

References 

Educational institutions with year of establishment missing
Secondary schools in Chile
Schools in Cachapoal Province